Martina Hingis was the defending champion but did not compete that year.

Venus Williams won in the final 6–3, 6–0 against Meghann Shaughnessy.

Seeds
A champion seed is indicated in bold text while text in italics indicates the round in which that seed was eliminated. The top four seeds received a bye to the second round.

  Venus Williams (champion)
  Amanda Coetzer (semifinals)
  Conchita Martínez (second round)
  Arantxa Sánchez-Vicario (quarterfinals)
  Magdalena Maleeva (second round)
  Justine Henin (quarterfinals)
  Meghann Shaughnessy (final)
  Magüi Serna (first round)

Draw

Final

Top half

Bottom half

External links
 2001 Betty Barclay Cup draw

2001 WTA Tour